The Amis des monuments rouennais (A.M.R.; Friends of Rouen Monuments) or  Société des amis des monuments rouennais (Society of Friends of Rouen Monuments) is an association in the French city of Rouen, with the main aim of saving threatened historic buildings there. It was established in 1886 and is now based in the city's Hôtel des sociétés savantes at 190 rue Beauvoisine. In French law it is an 'association loi de 1901'.

Presidents (honorary and actual)

Honorary presidents 
 Charles Garnier (1825-1898), honorary president and architect
  (1858-1934), honorary president, architect, historian, archaeologist
  (1845-1920), first president [1886-1898], honorary president (1901), curator of the musée de la céramique de Rouen
 Eugène Lefèvre-Pontalis (1862-1923), architectural historian and archaeologist
  (1884-1969), archaeologist, collector, philanthropist, patron and entrepreneur
  (1901-1964), medical doctor

Presidents

Members

Current 
Michel Benoist - Nicole Benoist - Jean-Pierre Chaline (1939-) - Danielle Claveau - Henry Decaëns (1942-) - Christiane Decaëns - Jean-Paul Hellot - Jacques Petit - Yvonne Néel-Soudais - Jacques Marchand - Françoise Marchand - Alain Loos - Daniel Duval - Isabelle Cipan - Valérie Krowicki - Dominique Samson - Jérémy Vivier - Monique Delabarre - Michel Garraud - Bernard Marinier - Marylène Champalbert - Jacques Calu - Marie-Claire Crozatier - Guillaume Gohon - Valérie Krowicki - Jacques Lebret - Jacques Lefort - Jacqueline Prévost - Stéphane Rioland - Dominique Samson - Paul-André Sement

Founder 
Ernest Fauquet (1830-1906) - Julien Félix (1827-1900) - Jules Adeline (1845-1909) - Octave Fréret - Lucien Lefort (1850-1916) - Jules Hector Despois de Folleville (1848-1929) - Jules Hédou (1833-1905) - Georges Dubosc (1854-1927) - Jules de la Querrière (1827-1889) - Barre - Hippolyte Cusson (1814-1899) - Ferdinand Marrou (1836-1917) - Charles Touzet (1850-19?) - Narcisse Beaurain (1843-1941) - Charles Maillet du Boullay (1829-1891) - Émile Frédéric Nicolle (1830-1894) - Edmond Lebel (1834-1908) - Jean-Baptiste Foucher (1832-1907) - Émile Janet (1838-1920) - Wallon - François Devaux (1840-1904) - Louis Loisel (1843-1894) - Louis-Gabriel Bellon (1819-1899) - François Depeaux (1853-1920) - E. Pineau - Raphaël Garretta (1851-1930) - Valérius Leteurtre (1837-1905) - Edmond Bonnet - Albert Fromage (1843-1904)

Former  
Gaston Le Breton (1845-1920) - Léon de Vesly (1844-1920) - André Dubosc (-1935) - Georges Dubosc (1854-1927) - Raoul Aubé (1846-1921) - Édouard Duveau (1839-1917) - Narcisse Beaurain - Edmond Bonet - Émile Bellon - Charles Collette - G. Debray - Louis Deglatigny (1854-1936) - François Depeaux (1853-1920) - F. Devaux - Ernest Fauquet - Eugène Fauquet (1850-1926) - J. Félix - J.-B. Faucher - A. Fleury - Albert Fromage (1843-1904) - R. Garreta - Onésime Geoffroy - Émile Janet - Jules Lecerf - Lucien Lefort (1850-1916) - Legrip - Ferdinand Marrou (1836-1917) - G. Moïse - V. Quesné - Paul Toutain - A. Witz - Marie - Raoul Brunon (1854-1929) - Balley - Antonio Keittinger (1855-1902) - Henri Delamare - Paul Brunon - Gustave Leseigneur - Ruel Martin - René Martin - François Hue - Levesque - Élie Percepied - Édouard Pelay (1842-1921) - Ferdinand Coutan (1852-1952) - Leverdier - Desmonts - Guérin - Jean Lafond (1888-1975) - Émile Schneider - Georges Lemeilleur - Henri Gadeau de Kerville (1858-1940) - Le Testu - Émile Bellon - Marcel Cartier (1861-1926) - Émile Fauquet - Chivet - Julien Loth (1837-1913) - Héron - Paul Pinchon - Roncero y Martinez - Lamain - Paul Piquet - Henri Hie - Marcel Nicolle (1871-1934) - G. Laurent - Lancesseur - Lassire - Héaullé - Denize - J. Fontaine - Brunet-Debaines - A. de Rothiacob - Albert Lambert - Chédanne - Lestringant - Raymond Loisel - Delarue - G. Vallée - Le Villain - Laborde - Latouche - Heurion - Lefèvre-Mézand - Ernest Delaunay (1854-1939) - Armand Descande - Paul Barre - E. Simon - A? Boutrolle - Julien Robert - Montier - Morel - Dardel - Lamy - Léon Coutil (1856-1943) - Richard Waddington (1838-1913) - François-Xavier Knieder (-1904) - Lucien Deglatigny - C. Caill - Louvet-Renaux - G. Girieud - Lambard - Thénard - Édouard Delabarre (1871-1951) - Abel Blanchet - Georges de Robillard de Beaurepaire (1863-1941) - Verpillot - Keittinger - Daniel Lenoir - Calippe - Paissard - Stanislas Villette - Mainnemare - Charles Leblond - Robert Lesage - Louis Dupendant - Laurent Trévoux - Pierre Le Verdier - Bernard Héronchelle - Lesourd - Giraud - Augé - Robert de Pomereu (1860-1937) - G. Chavoutier - Ridel - Gaston Lévy - Bonet-Paon - Le Plé - Le Bocq - Auguste Jeanne - Wilhelm - Ravenez - Henri Cavrel - Maurice Lemarchand - Paul Baudoüin (1844-1931) - Sevin - Augustin Le Marchand - A. Chevalier - Martin - Allais - Auguste Leblond - Georges Ruel (1860-1942) - Georges Privey - Gaston Bertel - Armand Le Corbeiller - Vaumousse - Hoffman - Georges Monflier - Georges Drouet - Achille Manchon - Louis Prévost - H. Godron - Manfred Wanckel - Georges Delacaisse - Pierre Derocque (1872-1934) - Maurice Nibelle (1860-1933) - Foucher fils - Henri Geispitz - Octave Marais - Henri Huet - G.-A. Godillot - André Dubosc - Joseph Dépinay - Taupin - Laquerière - Ch. Sahut - Pierre Chirol (1881-1953) - Albert Letourneur - Roussel - Bourgeois - Cartier - Maurice Allinne (1868-1942) - Jean-Pierre Bardet (1937-) - Louis Boucher (1857-1940) - Raymonde Bouttier (-1997) - Charles Brisson (1890-1979) - Alfred Cerné (1856-1937) - Élisabeth Chirol (1915-2001) - Louis Dubreuil (1873-1943) - Jeanne Dupic (1901–1984) - Henri Labrosse (1880-1942) - Daniel Lavallée (1925-1989) - Paul Le Cacheux (1873-1938) - Georges Liebert (-1951) - Raymond Quenedey (1868-1938) - Patrice Quéréel (1946-2015) - René Rouault de la Vigne (1889-1985) - Georges Vanier (1877-1961) - Pierre-René Wolf (1899-1972) - Lucien-René Delsalle (1935-2018)

Publications 
The AMR has an annual bulletin which looks further into themes from past conference and from diverse articles on Rouen's heritage as well as giving accounts of meetings, actions and commissions' activities.

Les Cahiers des monuments rouennais 
The AMR also publishes "Les Cahiers des monuments rouennais", a collection of thematic books on timber-framed houses, hôtels particuliers, monumental cemeteries and other topics.

 Nadine-Josette Chaline and Arlette Gaspérini, L'église Saint-Patrice de Rouen et ses vitraux, 1994, 48 pages.
 André Lefort, Rouen avant 1940, souvenir de pierres disparues, 1995, 168 pages.
 Jean-Pierre Chaline (ed.), Mémoire d'une ville : le Cimetière Monumental de Rouen, 1997, 128 pages.
 Jacques Petit, Défense et illustration des armoiries de Rouen, 1998, 48 pages.
 Jacques Petit, Au fil des rues : l'histoire rouennaise, 2001, 68 pages.
 Olivier Chaline, Les Hôtels particuliers de Rouen, 2002, 224 pages.
 Jean-Pierre Chaline (ed.), Demeures rouennaises du XIXe siècle, 2006, 220 pages.
 Jean-Pierre Chaline, Quand Rouen fêtait le millénaire normand, 2011, 68 pages.
 Jean-Pierre Chaline (ed.), Rouen, les maisons à pans de bois au fil des siècles et des rues, 2013, 236 pages.
 Jean-Pierre Chaline (ed.), Églises et chapelles de Rouen, un patrimoine à (re)découvrir, 2017, 252 pages.

References

External links 
 
 
  on Wikisource.

Learned societies of France
History of Rouen